Pacelli High School may refer to:

Pacelli High School (Austin, Minnesota) — Austin, Minnesota
Pacelli High School (Stevens Point, Wisconsin) — Stevens Point, Wisconsin
Pacelli High School (Columbus, Georgia) — Columbus, Georgia